OŠK Slovenský Grob is a Slovak football team, based in the town of Slovenský Grob. The club was founded in 1932.

Notable players
The following players had international caps for their respective countries. Players whose name is listed in bold represented their countries while playing for Slovenský Grob.
Past (and present) players who are the subjects of Wikipedia articles can be found here.

 Siradji Sani

References

External links 
at futbalvregione.sk 

Slovensky Grob
Sport in Bratislava Region
1932 establishments in Czechoslovakia
Association football clubs established in 1932